Anders Frithiof August (born 15 June 1978 in Copenhagen) is a Danish screenwriter, graduated from the National Film School of Denmark in 2007.

He wrote the short film The Pig, that was nominated for an Oscar in 2009. In 2011 he won the Danish film- and television industry's biggest talent award, The Nordisk Film Award.

He has written several episodes of Danish prime-time television as well as feature films, most notably Applause, which won numerous awards for main actress Paprika Steen in 2010, and the 2012 Oscar short listed comedy SuperClásico. The 2011 biopic A Funny Man, was the biggest local box-office hit in Denmark in 2011. Both films earned him nominations for a Danish Academy Award, the Robert Award as best screenwriter (the award eventually went to Lars Von Trier for Melancholia). He has since written a number of episodes of Danish drama The Legacy and is currently co-creating a new series for the same network, DR, the show is called Follow the Money and is a thriller on financial crime. It will premiere at the 2015 Berlinale. In 2015, BBC America / AMC announced they were developing a show created by August.

He is the son of Danish film and television director Bille August through his marriage to first wife Annie Munksgård Lauritzen. Through his father’s third marriage, he is the former stepson of Star Wars actress Pernilla August; who played the role of Anakin’s mother Shmi Skywalker in The Phantom Menace and Attack of the Clones, respectively. His younger half-sister on his father’s side is Danish-Swedish actress and singer-songwriter Alba August.

References

External links 
 
 
 Channel 4 Bio. 
 Los Angeles Times review of Applause 
 Anders F. August receives the "Nordisk Film Prisen" 
 SuperClàsico enters Oscar race 
 A Funny Man tops box-office 
 SuperClàsico on Oscar short list 
 Anders August to write screenplay about 1992 Danish Soccer Triumph  
 Anders August to co-create "Follow the Money"  
 BBC America announces development of Anders August show.  

1978 births
Living people
Danish male screenwriters
People from Copenhagen